Sorensen Beach, previously referred to as Sorenson's Beach, is an organized hamlet in the Rural Municipality of McKillop No. 220, Saskatchewan, Canada that is recognized as a designated place by Statistics Canada.

History 
The area was originally developed by Marius Andreas "Andy" Sorensen (1882–1964), a local commercial farmer who maintained his farming operations in the Duval/Strasbourg areas. The name of the organized hamlet was changed from Sorenson's Beach to Sorensen Beach on August 28, 2019.

Demographics 

References 

Designated places in Saskatchewan
McKillop No. 220, Saskatchewan
Organized hamlets in Saskatchewan
Division No. 6, Saskatchewan